Tyler Andrew Heineman (born June 19, 1991) is an American professional baseball catcher in the Pittsburgh Pirates organization. He played college baseball for the UCLA Bruins. The Houston Astros selected Heineman in the eighth round of the 2012 MLB draft. He previously played in MLB for the Miami Marlins, San Francisco Giants, Toronto Blue Jays and Pittsburgh Pirates.

High school and college
Heineman attended the Windward School in Los Angeles. There, he played for the school's baseball team. He batted .490 as a sophomore (2007), batted .619 as a junior (2008; establishing the Windward School single-season batting average record), and batted .487 and earned first-team All-California Interscholastic Federation Division IV honors as a senior (2009) in addition to Delphic League MVP honors.

Lightly recruited by college baseball programs, Heineman did not receive any scholarship offers. He enrolled at the University of California, Los Angeles (UCLA), where he made the baseball team as a walk-on. He played sparingly as a freshman and sophomore, receiving eight at bats as a freshman, and batting .261 in 23 games as a sophomore. Heineman became the Bruins' starting catcher his junior year after starting catcher Steve Rodriguez and recruit Austin Hedges signed professional contracts. He was named All-Pac-12 Conference and a semifinalist for the Johnny Bench Award, given annually to college baseball's best catcher.

Career

Houston Astros
The Houston Astros selected Heineman in the eighth round of the 2012 MLB draft. He played for the Tri-City ValleyCats of the Class A-Short Season New York–Penn League after signing, and his .358 batting average led the league, while he ranked second in the league in OBP (.452) and OPS (.882). He was a mid-season All Star, and an MiLB Organization All Star.

He played for the Lancaster JetHawks of the Class A-Advanced California League in 2013, and the Corpus Christi Hooks of the Class AA Texas League in 2014. After the 2014 regular season, the Astros assigned Heineman to the Salt River Rafters of the Arizona Fall League.

Heineman began the 2015 season with Corpus Christi, and received a midseason promotion to the Fresno Grizzlies of the Class AAA Pacific Coast League. He finished 2015 with a .285 batting average, three home runs, and 30 runs batted in. Heineman also spent 2016 with Fresno, where he batted .259 with three home runs and 14 RBIs.

Milwaukee Brewers
During spring training in 2017, the Astros traded Heineman to the Milwaukee Brewers for a player to be named later or cash considerations. The Brewers assigned him to the Colorado Springs Sky Sox, where he posted a .281 batting average with two home runs and 20 RBIs in 199 at bats.

Arizona Diamondbacks
On November 13, 2018, Heineman signed a minor-league contract with the Arizona Diamondbacks. He opened the 2019 season with the Reno Aces, batting .325/.407/.525 in 80 at bats.

Miami Marlins
On June 3, 2019, the Diamondbacks traded Heineman to the Miami Marlins for cash considerations. On September 3, the Marlins selected Heineman's contract. He made his major league debut on September 4 versus the Pittsburgh Pirates, striking out as a pinch hitter. He recorded his first MLB hit on September 25; a pinch-hit double off Jacob deGrom. He hit his first career home run off Zack Wheeler on September 26. On October 16, Heineman was outrighted to AAA New Orleans. He was an MiLB Organization All Star. He became a free agent following the 2019 season.

San Francisco Giants
On January 6, 2020, Heineman signed a minor-league deal with the San Francisco Giants with an invitation for spring training. On July 23, 2020, his contract was selected to the major league roster. In 2020 he batted .190/.202/.506 with 8 hits over 42 trips to the plate. He was outrighted off of the 40-man roster on November 1 and became a free agent on November 2, 2020.

St. Louis Cardinals
On November 13, 2020, Heineman signed a minor league contract with the St. Louis Cardinals.
On July 1, 2021, after hitting .254 in only 77 plate appearances with the Triple-A Memphis Redbirds, Heineman was released by the Cardinals.

Philadelphia Phillies
On July 3, 2021, Heineman signed a minor league deal with the Philadelphia Phillies organization. Heineman played in 20 games for the Triple-A Lehigh Valley IronPigs, hitting .274 with 6 RBI's. He became a free agent following the season.

Toronto Blue Jays
On March 12, 2022, Heineman signed a minor league contract with the Toronto Blue Jays. He was selected to the active roster on April 11.

Pittsburgh Pirates
On May 16, 2022, Tyler Heineman was claimed off waivers by the Pittsburgh Pirates. On November 18, he was non tendered and became a free agent. He re-signed a minor league deal on December 12.

Personal life
Heineman's younger brother, Scott, is a professional baseball outfielder. Their father, Steve, served in the Santa Monica Police Department.

References

External links

UCLA Bruins bio

1991 births
Living people
People from Pacific Palisades, California
Baseball players from Los Angeles
Major League Baseball catchers
Miami Marlins players
San Francisco Giants players
Toronto Blue Jays players
Pittsburgh Pirates players
UCLA Bruins baseball players
Tri-City ValleyCats players
Lancaster JetHawks players
Corpus Christi Hooks players
Salt River Rafters players
Fresno Grizzlies players
Tigres del Licey players
American expatriate baseball players in the Dominican Republic
Colorado Springs Sky Sox players
Reno Aces players
New Orleans Baby Cakes players
Memphis Redbirds players
Lehigh Valley IronPigs players
Buffalo Bisons (minor league) players
Wisconsin Woodchucks players
Windward School alumni